Sing Sing is a 1983 Italian comedy film directed by Sergio Corbucci. It stars
Adriano Celentano, Enrico Montesano and the British actress, Vanessa Redgrave. It was released in Italy on 15 October 1983.

Plot

Part 1
A Rome mechanic becomes convinced that he is the son of the Queen of the United Kingdom (Redgrave).

Part 2
And an inspector has to protect a film dubber pursued by a psychopath.

Cast
Adriano Celentano as Alfredo Boghi
Enrico Montesano as Edoardo
Marina Suma as Linda
Vanessa Redgrave as Queen
Désirée Nosbusch as Tourist
Carlo Monti
Lando Fiorini
Angela Goodwin
Ugo Bologna
Pietro De Silva
Rodolfo Laganà
Lucio Rosato
Orsetta Gregoretti
Franco Giacobini
Gianni Minà as himself

References

External links
 

1983 films
1983 comedy films
1980s Italian-language films
Films shot in Italy
Films directed by Sergio Corbucci
Films scored by Armando Trovajoli
Italian comedy films
1980s Italian films